In U.S. Law, Section 15 lands are public lands that lie outside a grazing district administered by the Bureau of Land Management (BLM) under Section 15 of the Taylor Grazing Act of 1934. The BLM authorizes livestock grazing on these lands by issuing leases to private parties.

References 

United States Department of Agriculture